Nickelodeon  is a children's channel broadcasting to Sweden, the channels headquarters is based in the United States.

Nickelodeon is the most popular commercial children's television channel in Sweden. SVTB is by far the most popular non-commercial channel, while Disney Channel is a strong second.

History
Nickelodeon has been available in Sweden since 1996 when a pan-Scandinavian version was launched on the analogue Viasat platform. Since 2001, it has been broadcasting in the digital terrestrial television network. This pan-Scandinavian channel used to broadcast between 6 a.m. and 6 p.m. since it started sharing a transponder with TV6 Nature/Action World in the late 1990s. In March 2008, Nickelodeon received a license to broadcast between 5 a.m. and 7 p.m. on the terrestrial network.

On 18 June 2008 the dedicated Swedish version of Nickelodeon was launched with a separate schedule. The new channel broadcasts between 5 a.m. and 7 p.m. on most digital pay television platforms. Unlike the Pan-Scandinavian channel, which was broadcast from the UK, the Swedish version is broadcast from the Netherlands.

Since September 2013, Nickelodeon Sweden started to use the new Idents from Nickelodeon USA and Nickelodeon UK & Ireland.

The channel used to share frequency space with Comedy Central Sweden since the launch of the latter in January 2009. The two channels got separate channel slots in November 2013. This allowed Nickelodeon Sweden to start broadcasting between 5 a.m. and 9 p.m. on most providers from 15 November.

Another hour was added to the broadcast day on 1 October 2015. After that, the channel would broadcast between 5 a.m. and 10 p.m.

Shows
The schedule starts with a Nick Jr strand for younger children with series such as Dora the Explorer, Backyardigans and PAW Patrol. The channel also includes music video strands called "Nick Hits". Cartoons for younger children are dubbed into Swedish. Non-cartoon series aimed an older audience used to be broadcast in Live-action Programming are English with Swedish subtitles, but they are currently broadcast with Swedish dubbing.

The Nicktoon The Fairly OddParents is broadcast on Disney Channel and Nickelodeon (as of Spring 2009).

References

External links
Nickelodeon Sweden

Sweden
Children's television networks
Television channels in Sweden
Broadcasting in the Netherlands
2008 establishments in Sweden
Television channels and stations established in 2008